Doolittle is a census-designated place (CDP) in Hidalgo County, Texas. The population was 2,769 at the 2010 United States Census. It is part of the McAllen–Edinburg–Mission Metropolitan Statistical Area.

Geography
Doolittle is located at  (26.364570, -98.121522).

Demographics
As of the census of 2000, there were 2,358 people, 543 households, and 508 families residing in the CDP. The population density was 554.2 people per square mile (213.7/km2). There were 599 housing units at an average density of 140.8/sq mi (54.3/km2). The racial makeup of the CDP was 46.48% White, 0.08% African American, 0.25% Native American, 0.08% Asian, 50.81% from other races, and 2.29% from two or more races. Hispanic or Latino of any race were 95.97% of the population.

There were 543 households, out of which 68.5% had children under the age of 18 living with them, 76.1% were married couples living together, 13.3% had a female householder with no husband present, and 6.4% were non-families. 5.0% of all households were made up of individuals, and 2.4% had someone living alone who was 65 years of age or older. The average household size was 4.34 and the average family size was 4.50.

In the CDP, the population was spread out, with 43.3% under the age of 18, 12.0% from 18 to 24, 28.4% from 25 to 44, 13.2% from 45 to 64, and 3.1% who were 65 years of age or older. The median age was 22 years. For every 100 females, there were 97.8 males. For every 100 females age 18 and over, there were 96.2 males.

The median income for a household in the CDP was $23,403, and the median income for a family was $24,792. Males had a median income of $15,469 versus $14,853 for females. The per capita income for the CDP was $6,349. About 35.9% of families and 41.1% of the population were below the poverty line, including 47.6% of those under age 18 and 56.4% of those age 65 or over.

Education
Doolittle is served by the Edinburg Consolidated Independent School District (ECISD).

Zoned elementary campuses serving sections include Crawford Elementary School and Monte Christo Elementary School (grades PK-5), All residents are zoned to Harwell Middle School(6-8), and Economedes High School (9-12).

In addition, South Texas Independent School District operates magnet schools that serve the community.

All of Hidalgo County is in the service area of South Texas College.

References

Census-designated places in Hidalgo County, Texas
Census-designated places in Texas